Tonpin may refer to several places in Burma:

 Tonpin, Banmauk
 Tonpin, Homalin